Marshal of the air force or marshal of the air is a five-star rank (or NATO equivalent OF-10) and an English-language term for the most senior rank in some air forces. It is usually the direct equivalent of a general of the air force in other air forces, a field marshal or general of the army in many armies, or a naval admiral of the fleet.

The rank may be regarded as originating in the British Royal Air Force (RAF), in which the most senior rank remains Marshal of the RAF. Several other Commonwealth air forces and others that have been influenced by the practices of the RAF (especially in the Middle East) have similar names for the most senior rank, such as Marshal of the Royal Australian Air Force (RAAF). There is sometimes confusion with the next most senior ranks in such cases: air chief marshal and air marshal (proper). The rank of Marshal of the RAF existed on paper from 1919; the first person to hold the rank was Lord Hugh Trenchard, from 1927. In the UK the rank has often been held by the most senior, actively-serving RAF officer, whereas in other Commonwealth countries the equivalent rank has been purely ceremonial or honorary in function. (For example, the rank of Marshal of the RAAF has been held only by a monarch or consort.)

In Portuguese the equivalent air force ranks are Marechal do Ar (lit. "Marshal of the Air") in Brazil, or Marechal in Portugal, both of which are sometimes translated as "marshal of the air force". In the past, a similar name has been used for the most senior rank in Italian air forces.

A holder of several senior ranks in the Indonesian air force (Tentara Nasional Indonesia-Angkatan Udara; TNI-AU),  may be referred to as a marsekal di TNI-AU (lit. "marshal of the TNI-AU"). The most senior rank is Marsekal Besar ("Grand Marshal") is sometimes translated as "marshal of the air force".

In Nazi Germany, the most senior rank of the Luftwaffe was Generalfeldmarschall (a rank that was also used by the German Army). While the commander of the  Luftwaffe, Hermann Göring was the only person to hold the more senior rank of Reichsmarschall, this rank could technically have been bestowed on any senior officer of the Heer (army), Kriegsmarine (navy) and Luftwaffe, which together comprised the Wehrmacht.

While the air forces of the former Soviet Union had ranks named chief marshal of the aviation branch (or "chief marshal of the air force") and marshal of the aviation branch (or "marshal of the air force"), these were four-star and three-star ranks, respectively (and therefore equivalent to the less senior RAF ranks of Air Chief Marshal and Air Marshal respectively).

Seniority
A marshal of the air force can be properly considered equivalent to an army marshals or field marshal in many countries, as well as the naval rank of admiral of the fleet. That is, marshal of the air force is a five-star rank and in NATO countries it is described by the ranking code of OF-10.  As such a senior rank, it is very seldom held.  It is awarded either in a ceremonial capacity to Heads of State or members of Royal Families, or to the most Senior Officers in large Air Forces.

In the Air Force of Australia, India, Thailand and the United Kingdom, "Marshals of the Air Force" are immediately senior to Air Chief Marshals.  In the case of New Zealand, although the rank of Marshal of the Royal New Zealand Air Force has been bestowed, no Royal New Zealand Air Force officer has attained higher rank than Air Marshal and the New Zealand rank of Air Chief Marshal only exists on paper.  A similar situation to the one in New Zealand also existed in Malaysia until the 1970s when the Royal Malaysian Air Force replaced its air-officer ranks with general-officer ranks, although it retained the rank of Marshal of the Royal Malaysian Air Force.  The rank of Marshal of the Royal Canadian Air Force was never granted.

During Germany's Nazi period, the Luftwaffe (Air Force), in common with the Heer (Army), used the rank of generalfeldmarschall (Field Marshal), which was equivalent to großadmiral (Grand Admiral) in the Navy.  Generalfeldmarschall was immediately senior to generaloberst (Colonel General) and it was the most senior German Air Force and Army rank until the promotion of Hermann Göring, the Commander of the Luftwaffe, to the even higher rank of reichsmarschall (Imperial Marshal or Marshal of the Realm) in July 1940.  The German ranks of reichsmarschall and generalfeldmarschall ceased to exist with the fall of the Third Reich.

Insignia and distinguishing flags

Rank insignia
There are a variety of rank insignia in use by the different air forces which maintain a rank of marshal of the air force.  Some, such as the Royal Air Force, derive the pattern from the sleeve lace for an admiral of the fleet, using one broad light blue band on a wider broad black band with four narrow light blue bands each on slightly wider black bands.  Others use a pattern of stars, typically numbering five in total.

Command flags
The following command or rank flags are or have been in use:

Current holders of the rank

, there are 14 living individuals who hold or have held the rank, or its equivalents, of Marshal of the Air Force. 10 of those are royalty who have been appointed to the rank in a ceremonial capacity, including Queen Sirikit of Thailand, the Prince of Wales and the current head of state of Malaysia. In the case of Malaysia, the elected Yang di-Pertuan Agong is appointed a Marshal of the Air Force for his tenure as head of state, but relinquishes the rank after completing his term in office. He can, however, be re-appointed to the rank if he later serves another term.

The Duke of Edinburgh held the ceremonial rank of a Marshal of the Royal Air Force, as well as the honorary ranks of Marshal of the Royal Australian Air Force and Marshal of the Royal New Zealand Air Force; owing to their smaller size, however, neither of the latter two air forces have ever used the rank in an operational capacity. Although the rank of Marshal of the Royal Canadian Air Force existed on paper until 1968, the Duke of Edinburgh was never appointed to this rank nor to the other Canadian 5-star ranks before they were abolished that year. In 2012, his son, the Prince of Wales, was appointed to the British rank.

The remaining four holders of the rank were all serving air officers, three of whom served as Chief of the Air Staff of the Royal Air Force, and were promoted to the rank of Marshal of the Royal Air Force upon concluding their tenure. Of those, only Lord Craig did not retire then, as he went on to serve as Chief of the Defence Staff as a Marshal of the RAF. In June 2014, retired Air Chief Marshal the Lord Stirrup was promoted to Marshal of the RAF in a ceremonial capacity, marking the first time since 1992 that an RAF air officer had been awarded the rank; Lord Stirrup had served as Chief of the Defence Staff from 2006 to 2010.

Marshal of the Air Force Roshan Goonetileke of the Sri Lanka Air Force is the most recent man to gain the rank, having been promoted in October 2019. Goonetileke was credited in playing a major role in ending the almost three decade long civil war in his country. He was recently appointed as the Governor of the Western Province of Sri Lanka.

List of marshals of the air force

Other countries
The rank also exists or has existed (on paper) in Afghanistan, Bangladesh, Brunei, Iran, South Korea, Nigeria, Pakistan and South Vietnam, but not all of these countries have used it.  The Turkish Air Force maintains a rank of hava mareşalı (literally air marshal but equivalent to five-star rank).  The Indonesian Air Force maintains the rank of marsekal besar (literally, "great marshal" and also a five-star rank) although no Indonesian Air Force officer has ever been promoted to the rank. The French Air Force, in common with the French Army has marshal of France as its most senior rank.  However, unlike the French Army, the Air Force has never had one of its officers created a marshal of France.

The United States does not use the rank, instead using general of the air force which has only been held once and is currently retained only on paper.  China also does not use a marshal rank, preferring first class general (kong jun yi ji shang jiang) which has never been held by an air force officer and was abolished in 1994.  Spain uses the equivalent rank of captain general of the Air Force which is held only by HM King Felipe VI.

Fictional use
A marshal of the air force is mentioned in Roald Dahl's book The BFG.  Dahl himself was a Royal Air Force officer during World War II.

See also
Air force officer rank insignia

References 

Air force ranks